Zlatko Tripković is a Yugoslavian former footballer who played as a midfielder.

Career 
Tripković emigrated to the United States in 1968. In 1971, he played in the National Soccer League with Hamilton Croatia. In 1972, he played college soccer with Davis & Elkins College, and was named to the All West Virginia Intercollegiate Athletic Conference Soccer Team. He also served as an assistant coach for the college team. He was prevented from playing at the college level in 1973 as he signed several professional contracts before the commencement of the season.

In 1974, he played in the North American Soccer League with Baltimore Comets. He made 10 appearances for Baltimore. In 1975, he played in the American Soccer League with Rhode Island Oceaneers.

References  

Living people
Association football midfielders
Yugoslav footballers
Hamilton Croatia players
Baltimore Comets players
Rhode Island Oceaneers players
Canadian National Soccer League players
North American Soccer League (1968–1984) players
American Soccer League (1933–1983) players
Yugoslav football managers
Year of birth missing (living people)